Gaurav Singh (born 8 November 1996) is an Indian cricketer. He made his Twenty20 debut for Uttarakhand in the 2018–19 Syed Mushtaq Ali Trophy on 2 March 2019. He made his first-class debut on 17 December 2019, for Uttarakhand in the 2019–20 Ranji Trophy.

References

External links
 

1996 births
Living people
Indian cricketers
Uttarakhand cricketers
Place of birth missing (living people)